Foja may refer to:

Foja Mountains
Foja Range languages